The term "quarter dollar" refers to a quarter-unit of several currencies that are named "dollar". One dollar ($1) is normally divided into subsidiary currency of 100 cents, so a quarter dollar is equal to 25 cents. These quarter dollars (aka quarters) are denominated as either Coins or as banknotes. Although more than a dozen countries have their own unique dollar currency, not all of them use quarters. This article only includes quarters that were intended for circulation, those that add up to units of dollars, and those in the form of a coin.

Currently minted

See also
 Surinamese dollar 
 Twenty-five cent coin (Netherlands)

Notes

References

Twenty-five-cent coins